Russell Stewart is a New Zealand rugby league footballer who played professionally for Bradford Northern in England.

Playing career
Stewart is from the Ngongotaha Chiefs club and represented the Bay of Plenty.

He spent three seasons in England playing for Bradford Northern between 1987 and 1990.

Stewart did not play in Bradford Northern's 12-12 draw with Castleford in the 1987 Yorkshire County Cup Final during the 1987–88 season at Headingley Rugby Stadium, Leeds on Saturday 17 October 1987, and played  in the 11-2 victory over Castleford in the 1987 Yorkshire County Cup Final replay during the 1987–88 season at Elland Road, Leeds on Saturday 31 October 1987.

He became the player-coach of the Ngongotaha Chiefs in 1992 and in 1993 he was the player-coach of Bay of Plenty in the National Provincial competition.

References

Living people
New Zealand rugby league players
Ngongotaha Chiefs players
Bradford Bulls players
Bay of Plenty rugby league team players
New Zealand rugby league coaches
Bay of Plenty rugby league team coaches
Northern Districts rugby league team players
Rugby league five-eighths
Year of birth missing (living people)